Squid is an English post-punk band from Brighton, England. Consisting of lead singer and drummer Ollie Judge, guitarists Louis Borlase and Anton Pearson, bassist Laurie Nankivell and keyboardist Arthur Leadbetter, they are currently based in Bristol. 

Squid released their debut EP Town Centre in 2019 on Speedy Wunderground and have since released four singles on Warp Records. Their debut album, Bright Green Field, was released by Warp Records on 7 May 2021. It received widespread critical acclaim and debuted at No. 4 on the UK Albums Chart.

History 
Squid formed in Brighton, England in 2016. They have cited Neu! and This Heat as influences. In 2019, they released their second EP, titled Town Centre, to critical acclaim. Town Centre was produced by Dan Carey and released on Speedy Wunderground. In March 2020, Squid signed to Warp Records and have released five singles with them as of April 2021. They were planning on touring Europe throughout 2020 before the COVID-19 pandemic.

Taking advantage of lockdown, the band spent most of 2020 recording what would be their debut full length album, Bright Green Field, again working with producer Dan Carey. The album was released on 7 May 2021 and was promoted by three singles, "Narrator", "Paddling" and "Pamphlets". It was well received by critics.

Squid appeared at the Glastonbury Festival in June 2022, and are due to appear at Rock en Seine and Paredes de Coura festivals in August 2022.

Squid recorded their second full length album, O Monolith, in Wiltshire in spring 2022. It is scheduled to be released on 9 June 2023, once again with Warp Records.

Members
Current
Ollie Judge – lead vocals, drums (2016–present)
Louis Borlase – guitar, bass guitar, vocals (2016–present)
Arthur Leadbetter – keyboards, strings, percussion (2016–present)
Laurie Nankivell – bass guitar, brass, percussion (2016–present)
Anton Pearson – guitar, bass, vocals, percussion  (2016–present)

Discography

Studio albums

Extended plays 
 LINO (2017, Bear on a Bicycle)
 Town Centre (2019, Speedy Wunderground)
 Natural Resources (2020, Warp)
 Near the Westway (2021, Warp)

Singles

Music videos

References

External links

English rock music groups
English experimental rock groups
Musical groups established in 2017
Musical quintets
Warp (record label) artists
2017 establishments in the United Kingdom
Musical groups from Brighton and Hove
Musical groups from Bristol
Krautrock musical groups